Isomerida is a genus of longhorn beetles of the subfamily Lamiinae, containing the following species:

 Isomerida albicollis  (Laporte, 1840)
 Isomerida amicta Pascoe, 1866
 Isomerida apiratinga Martins & Galileo, 1992
 Isomerida cinctiventris Bates, 1885
 Isomerida ibitira Martins & Galileo, 1992
 Isomerida invicta Galileo & Martins, 1996
 Isomerida lanifica (Germar, 1824)
 Isomerida lineata Bates, 1874
 Isomerida longicornis Bates, 1881
 Isomerida paraba Galileo & Martins, 2001
 Isomerida paraiba Galileo & Martins, 1996
 Isomerida ruficornis Bates, 1866
 Isomerida santamarta Galileo & Martins, 2001
 Isomerida separata Galileo & Martins, 1996
 Isomerida sergioi Galileo & Martins, 2009
 Isomerida sororcula Galileo & Martins, 1996
 Isomerida tupi Martins & Galileo, 1992
 Isomerida vittata (Pascoe, 1859)

References

Hemilophini